In ancient Greek religion and mythology, Zagreus was sometimes identified with a god worshipped by the followers of Orphism, the "first Dionysus", a son of Zeus and Persephone, who was dismembered by the Titans and reborn. In the earliest mention of Zagreus, he is paired with Gaia and called the "highest" god, though perhaps only in reference to the gods of the underworld. Aeschylus, however, links Zagreus with Hades, possibly as Hades' son, or as Hades himself. Noting "Hades' identity as Zeus' katachthonios alter ego", Timothy Gantz postulated that Zagreus, originally the son of Hades and Persephone, later merged with the Orphic Dionysus, the son of Zeus and Persephone.

Etymology and origins 
As interpreted by Karl Kerényi based on a Hesychian gloss, the Ionian Greek word for a hunter who catches living animals is called zagreus, and the word zagre signifies a "pit for the capture of live animals". "We may justifiably ask," observes Kerényi, "why was this great mythical hunter, who in Greece became a mysterious god of the underworld, a capturer of wild animals and not a killer?" Kerényi links the figure of Zagreus with archaic Dionysiac rites in which small animals were torn limb from limb and their flesh devoured raw, "not as an emanation of the Greek Dionysian religion, but rather as a migration or survival of a prehistoric rite".

Underworld 
The early mentions of Zagreus, which occur only in fragments from lost works, connect Zagreus with the Greek underworld. The earliest is in a single  quoted line from the (6th century BC?) epic Alcmeonis:

Mistress Earth [Gaia], and Zagreus highest of all the gods.

Perhaps here meaning the highest god of the underworld.

Evidently for Aeschylus, Zagreus was, in fact, an underworld god. In a fragment from one of Aeschylus' lost Sisyphus plays (c. 5th century BC), Zagreus seems to be the son of Hades, while in Aeschylus' Egyptians (Aigyptioi), Zagreus was apparently identified with Hades himself. A fragment from Euripides' lost play Cretan Men (Kretes) has the chorus describe themselves as initiates of Idaean Zeus and celebrants of "night-ranging Zagreus, performing his feasts of raw flesh".

Orphic Dionysus Zagreus 

The Zagreus from the Euripides fragment is suggestive of Dionysus, the wine god son of Zeus and Semele, and in fact, although it seems not to occur anywhere in Orphic sources, the name “Zagreus” is elsewhere identified with an Orphic Dionysus, who had a very different tradition from the standard one. This Dionysus was a son of Zeus and Persephone who was, as an infant, attacked and dismembered by the Titans, but later reborn as the son of Zeus and Semele.

The sparagmos 
The dismemberment of Dionysus-Zagreus (the sparagmos) is often considered to be the most important myth of Orphism. As pieced together from various ancient sources, the reconstructed story, usually given by modern scholars, goes as follows. Zeus had intercourse with Persephone in the form of a serpent, producing Dionysus. He is taken to Mount Ida where (like the infant Zeus) he is guarded by the dancing Curetes. Zeus intended Dionysus to be his successor as ruler of the cosmos, but a jealous Hera incited the Titans to kill the child. Distracting the infant Dionysus with various toys, including a mirror, the Titans seized Dionysus and tore (or cut) him to pieces. The pieces were then boiled, roasted and partially eaten, by the Titans. But Athena managed to save Dionysus' heart, by which Zeus was able to contrive his rebirth from Semele.

Although the extant Orphic sources do not mention the name "Zagreus" in connection with this dismembered Dionysus (or anywhere else), the (c. 3rd century BC) poet Callimachus perhaps did. We know that Callimachus, as well as his contemporary Euphorion, told the story of the dismembered child, and Byzantine sources quote Callimachus as referring to the birth of a "Dionysos Zagreus", explaining that "Zagreus" was the poet's name for a chthonic Dionysus, the son of Zeus by Persephone. The earliest certain identification of Zagreus with the dismembered Dionysus occurs in the writings of the late 1st century – early 2nd century AD biographer and essayist Plutarch, while the c. 5th century AD Greek epic poet Nonnus' Dionysiaca, which tells the story of this Orphic Dionysus, calls him the "older Dionysos ... illfated Zagreus", "Zagreus the horned baby", "Zagreus, the first Dionysos", "Zagreus the ancient Dionysos", and "Dionysos Zagreus".

The 1st century BC historian Diodorus Siculus says that according to "some writers of myths" there were two gods named Dionysus, an older one, who was the son of Zeus and Persephone, but that the "younger one [born to Zeus and Semele] also inherited the deeds of the older, and so the men of later times, being unaware of the truth and being deceived because of the identity of their names thought there had been but one Dionysus."

According to Diodorus, this older Dionysus, was represented in painting and sculpture with horns, because he "excelled in sagacity and was the first to attempt the yoking of oxen and by their aid to effect the sowing of the seed", and the younger was "called Dimetor (Of Two Mothers) ... because the two Dionysoi were born of one father, but of two mothers". He also said that Dionysus "was thought to have two forms ... the ancient one having a long beard, because all men in early times wore long beards, the younger one being youthful and effeminate and young."

Cooking / eating
Several accounts of the myth involved the Titans cooking and/or eating at least part of Dionysus. In the account attributed to Callimachus and Euphorion, the dismembered pieces of Dionysus were boiled in a cauldron, and Euphorion is quoted as saying that the pieces of Dionysus were placed over a fire. Diodorus also says that the pieces were "boiled", and the late 2nd century Christian writer Clement of Alexandria says that the pieces were "first boiled" in a cauldron, then pierced with spits and roasted. Arnobius, an early 4th century Christian apologist, says that Dionysus' severed parts were "thrown into pots that he might be cooked". None of these sources mention any actual eating, but other sources do. Plutarch says that the Titans "tasted his blood", the 6th century AD Neoplatonist Olympiodorus says that they ate "his flesh", and according to the 4th century euhemeristic account of the Latin astrologer and Christian apologist Firmicus Maternus, the Titans cooked the "members in various ways and devoured them" (membra consumunt), except for his heart.

Resurrection / rebirth
In the version of the story apparently told by Callimachus and Euphorion, the cauldron containing the boiled pieces of Dionysus, is given to Apollo for burial, who "stowed it away beside his tripod" at Delphi. And according to Philodemus, citing Euphorion, the pieces of Dionysus were "reassembled by Rhea, and brought back to life", while according to Diodorus Siculus, the reassembly and resurrection of Dionysus  was accomplished by Demeter. Later Orphic sources have Apollo receive Dionysus' remains from Zeus, rather than the Titans, and it was Apollo who reassembled Dionysus, rather than Rhea or Demeter.

In the accounts of Clement, and Firmicus Maternus cited above, as well as Proclus, and a scholium on Lycophron 355, Athena manages to save the heart of Dionysus, from which, according to Clement and the scholium, Athena received the name Pallas from the still beating (πάλλειν) heart. In Proculus' account Athena takes the heart to Zeus, and Dionysus is born again from Semele. According to Hyginus, Zeus "ground up his heart, put it in a potion, and gave it to Semele to drink", and she became pregnant with Dionysus.

Osiris
In the interpretatio graeca Dionysus is often identified with the Egyptian god Osiris. Stories of the dismemberment and resurrection of Osiris, parallel those of Dionysus Zagreus. According to Diodorus Siculus, Egyptian myths about Priapus said that the Titans conspired against Osiris, killed him, divided his body into equal parts, and "slipped them secretly out of the house". All but Osiris' penis, which since none of them "was willing to take it with him", they threw into the river. Isis, Osiris' wife, hunted down and killed the Titans, reassembled Osiris' body parts "into the shape of a human figure", and gave them "to the priests with orders that they pay Osiris the honours of a god". But since she was unable to recover the penis she ordered the priests "to pay to it the honours of a god and to set it up in their temples in an erect position."

Allegorical accounts
Diodorus Siculus reports an allegorical interpretation of the myth of the dismemberment of Dionysus as representing the production of wine. Diodorus knew of a tradition whereby this Orphic Dionysus was the son of Zeus and Demeter, rather than Zeus and Persephone. This parentage was explained allegorically by identifying Dionysus with the grape vine, Demeter with the earth, and Zeus with the rain, saying that "the vine gets its growth both from the earth and from rains and so bears as its fruit the wine which is pressed out from the clusters of grapes".  According to Diodorus, Dionysus' dismemberment by the Titans represented the harvesting of the grapes, and the subsequent "boiling" of his dismembered parts "has been worked into a myth by reason of the fact that most men boil the wine and then mix it, thereby improving its natural aroma and quality."

The Neronian-era Stoic Cornutus relates a similar allegorical interpretation, whereby the dismemberment represented the crushing of the grapes, and the rejoining of the dismembered pieces into a single body, represented the pouring of the juice into a single container.

Rationalized accounts
Diodorus also reports a rationalized account of the older Dionysus. In this account this Dionysus was a wise man, who was the inventor of the plough, as well as many other agricultural inventions. And according to Diodorus, these inventions, which greatly reduced manual labor, so pleased the people that they "accorded to him honours and sacrifices like those offered to the gods, since all men were eager, because of the magnitude of his service to them, to accord to him immortality."

Firmicus Maternus gives a rationalized euhemeristic account of the myth whereby Liber (Dionysus) was the bastard son of a Cretan king named Jupiter (Zeus). When Jupiter left his kingdom in the boy's charge, the king's jealous wife Juno (Hera), conspired with her servants the Titans to murder the bastard child. Beguiling him with toys, the Titans ambushed and killed the boy. To dispose of the evidence of their crime, the Titans chopped the body into pieces, cooked, and ate them. However the boy's sister Minerva (Athena), who had been part of the murder plot, kept the heart. When her father the king returned, the sister turned informer and gave the boy's heart to the king. In his fury the king tortured and killed the Titans, and in his grief, he had a statue of the boy made, which contained the boy's heart in its chest, and a temple erected in the boy's honour. The Cretans, In order to pacify their furious savage and despotic king, established the anniversary of the boy's death as a holy day. Sacred rites were held, in which the celebrants howling and feigning insanity tore to pieces a live bull with their teeth, and the basket in which boy's heart had been saved, was paraded to the blaring of flutes and the crashing of cymbals.

The anthropogony 

Most sources make no mention of what happened to the Titans after the murder of Dionysus. In the standard account of the Titans, given in Hesiod's Theogony (which does not mention Dionysus), after being overthrown by Zeus and the other Olympian gods, in the ten-year-long Titanomachy, the Titans are imprisoned in Tartarus. This might seem to preclude any subsequent story of the Titans' killing Dionysus,  and perhaps in an attempt to reconcile this standard account with the Dionysus Zagreus myth, according to Arnobius and Nonnus, the Titans end up imprisoned by Zeus in Tartarus, as punishment for their murder of Dionysus.

However, according to one source, from the fate of the Titans came a momentous event, the birth of humankind. Commonly presented as a part of the myth of the dismembered Dionysus Zagreus, is an Orphic anthropogony, that is an Orphic account of the origin of human beings. According to this widely held view, as punishment for the crime of the sparagmos, Zeus struck the Titans with his thunderbolt, and from the remains of the destroyed Titans humankind was born, which resulted in a human inheritance of ancestral guilt, for this original sin of the Titans, and by some accounts "formed the basis for an Orphic doctrine of the divinity of man." However, when and to what extent there existed any Orphic tradition which included these elements is the subject of open debate.

The only ancient source to explicitly connect the sparagmos and the anthropogony is the 6th century AD Neoplatonist Olympiodorus, who writes that, according to Orpheus, after the Titans had dismembered and eaten Dionysus, "Zeus, angered by the deed, blasts them with his thunderbolts, and from the sublimate of the vapors that rise from them comes the matter from which men are created." Olympiodorus goes on to conclude that, because the Titans had eaten his flesh, we their descendants, are a part of Dionysus.

The 2nd century AD biographer and essayist Plutarch, does make a connection between the sparagmos and the punishment of the Titans, but makes no mention of the anthropogony, or Orpheus, or Orphism. In his essay On the Eating of Flesh, Plutarch writes of "stories told about the sufferings and dismemberment of Dionysus and the outrageous assaults of the Titans upon him, and their punishment and blasting by thunderbolt after they had tasted his blood".

Earlier allusions to the myth possibly occur in the works of the poet Pindar, Plato, and Plato's student Xenocrates. A fragment from a poem, presumed to be by Pindar, mentions Persephone accepting "requital for ancient wrong", from the dead, which might be a reference to humans' inherited responsibility for the Titan's killing of Dionysus. Plato, in presenting a succession of stages whereby, because of excessive liberty, men degenerate from reverence for the law, to lawlessness, describes the last stage where "men display and reproduce the character of the Titans of story". This Platonic passage is often taken as referring to the anthropogony, however, whether men are supposed by Plato to "display and reproduce" this lawless character because of their Titanic heritage, or by simple imitation, is unclear. Xenocrates' reference to the Titans (and perhaps Dionysus) to explain Plato's use of the word "custody" (φρούρα), has also been seen as possible evidence of a pre-Hellenistic date for the myth.

In popular culture 
Zagreus is the protagonist of the 2020 video game Hades. In the game, Zagreus is the son of Hades and is attempting to escape the underworld to find his mother Persephone and learn why she left.

Notes

References 
 Arnobius, The Seven Books of Arnobius Adversus Gentes,  translated by Archibald Hamilton Bryce and Hugh Campbell, Edinburg: T. & T. Clark. 1871. Internet Archive.
 Bernabé, Alberto (2002), "La toile de Pénélope: a-t-il existé un mythe orphique sur Dionysos et les Titans?" Revue de l'histoire des religions 219(4): 401–433.
 Bernabé, Alberto (2003), "Autour du mythe orphique sur Dionysos et les Titans. Quelque notes critiques" in Des Géants à Dionysos. Mélanges offerts à F. Vian. D. A. P. Chuvin. Alessandria: 25–39.
 Burkert, Walter, Greek Religion, Harvard University Press, 1985. .
 Clement of Alexandria, The Exhortation to the Greeks. The Rich Man's Salvation. To the Newly Baptized. Translated by G. W. Butterworth. Loeb Classical Library No. 92. Cambridge, Massachusetts: Harvard University Press, 1919. . Online version at Harvard University Press.  Internet Archive 1960 edition.
 Collard, Christopher and Martin Cropp, Euripides Fragments: Oedipus-Chrysippus: Other Fragments,  Loeb Classical Library No. 506. Cambridge, Massachusetts: Harvard University Press, 2008. . Online version at Harvard University Press.
 Diodorus Siculus, Diodorus Siculus: The Library of History. Translated by C. H. Oldfather. Twelve volumes. Loeb Classical Library. Cambridge, Massachusetts: Harvard University Press; London: William Heinemann, Ltd. 1989. Online version by Bill Thayer
 Dodds, Eric R., The Greeks and the Irrational, University of California Press, 2004. .
 Edmonds, Radcliffe (1999), "Tearing Apart the Zagreus Myth: A Few Disparaging Remarks On Orphism and Original Sin", Classical Antiquity 18 (1999): 35–73. PDF .
 Edmonds, Radcliffe (2008), "Recycling Laertes' Shroud: More on Orphism and Original Sin" , Center for Hellenic Studies
 Edmonds, Radcliffe (2013), Redefining Ancient Orphism: A Study in Greek Religion, Cambridge; New York:  Cambridge University Press. .
 Firmicus Maternus, Firmicus Maternus: the Error of the Pagan Religions, translated by Clarence A. Forbes, Newman Press 1970. .
 Gantz, Timothy, Early Greek Myth: A Guide to Literary and Artistic Sources, Johns Hopkins University Press, 1996, Two volumes:  (Vol. 1),  (Vol. 2).
 Grimal, Pierre, The Dictionary of Classical Mythology, Wiley-Blackwell, 1996, .
 Guthrie, W. K. C., Orpheus and Greek Religion: A Study of the Orphic Movement, Princeton University Press, 1935. .
 Hard, Robin, The Routledge Handbook of Greek Mythology: Based on H.J. Rose's "Handbook of Greek Mythology", Psychology Press, 2004, .
 Harder, Annette, Callimachus: Aetia: Introduction, Text, Translation and Commentary, Oxford University Press, 2012. . (two volume set). Google Books
 Hesiod, Theogony, in The Homeric Hymns and Homerica with an English Translation by Hugh G. Evelyn-White, Cambridge, Massachusetts., Harvard University Press; London, William Heinemann Ltd. 1914. Online version at the Perseus Digital Library.
 Hyginus, Gaius Julius, Fabulae in Apollodorus' Library and Hyginus' Fabulae: Two Handbooks of Greek Mythology, Translated, with Introductions by R. Scott Smith and Stephen M. Trzaskoma, Hackett Publishing Company,  2007. .
 Kerényi, Karl, Dionysos: Archetypal image of indestructible life, trans. Ralph Manheim, Princeton University Press, 1976. .
 Kern, Otto. Orphicorum Fragmenta, Berlin, 1922. Internet Archive
 Lightfoot, J. L. Hellenistic Collection: Philitas. Alexander of Aetolia. Hermesianax. Euphorion. Parthenius. Edited and translated by J. L. Lightfoot. Loeb Classical Library No. 508. Cambridge, Massachusetts: Harvard University Press, 2010. . Online version at Harvard University Press.
 Linforth, Ivan M., The Arts of Orpheus, Berkeley, University of California Press, 1941. Online version at HathiTrust
 March, Jenny, Cassell's Dictionary of Classical Mythology, Casell & Co, 2001. . Internet Archive
 Morford, Mark P. O., Robert J. Lenardon, Classical Mythology, Eighth Edition, Oxford University Press, 2007. .
 Nauck, Johann August, Tragicorum graecorum fragmenta, Leipzig, Teubner, 1889. Internet Archive
 
 Nonnus, Dionysiaca; translated by Rouse, W H D, I Books I–XV. Loeb Classical Library No. 344, Cambridge, Massachusetts, Harvard University Press; London, William Heinemann Ltd. 1940. Internet Archive
 Nonnus, Dionysiaca; translated by Rouse, W H D, II Books XVI–XXXV. Loeb Classical Library No. 345, Cambridge, Massachusetts, Harvard University Press; London, William Heinemann Ltd. 1940. Internet Archive
 Nonnus, Dionysiaca; translated by Rouse, W H D, III Books XXXVI–XLVIII. Loeb Classical Library No. 346, Cambridge, Massachusetts, Harvard University Press; London, William Heinemann Ltd. 1940. Internet Archive
 Ogden, Daniel, Drakōn: Dragon Myth and Serpent Cult in the Greek and Roman Worlds, Oxford University Press, 2013. .
 Ovid, Metamorphoses, Brookes More. Boston. Cornhill Publishing Co. 1922. Online version at the Perseus Digital Library.
 Parker, Robert (2002), "Early Orphism" in The Greek World, edited by Anton Powell, Routledge, 2002. .
 Parker, Robert (2014), Review of Edmonds 2013. Bryn Mawr Classical Review BMCR 2014.07.13.
 Pausanias, Pausanias Description of Greece with an English Translation by W.H.S. Jones, Litt.D., and H.A. Ormerod, M.A., in 4 Volumes. Cambridge, Massachusetts, Harvard University Press; London, William Heinemann Ltd. 1918. Online version at the Perseus Digital Library.
 Plato, Meno in Plato in Twelve Volumes, Vol. 3 translated by W.R.M. Lamb. Cambridge, Massachusetts, Harvard University Press; London, William Heinemann Ltd. 1967.  Online version at the Perseus Digital Library
 Plato, Laws in Plato in Twelve Volumes, Vols. 10 & 11 translated by R.G. Bury. Cambridge, Massachusetts, Harvard University Press; London, William Heinemann Ltd. 1967 & 1968.  Online version at the Perseus Digital Library
 Plutarch, Moralia, Volume V: Isis and Osiris. The E at Delphi. The Oracles at Delphi No Longer Given in Verse. The Obsolescence of Oracles. Translated by Frank Cole Babbitt. Loeb Classical Library No. 306. Cambridge, Massachusetts: Harvard University Press, 1936. . Online version at Harvard University Press.
 Plutarch, Moralia, Volume XII: Concerning the Face Which Appears in the Orb of the Moon. On the Principle of Cold. Whether Fire or Water Is More Useful. Whether Land or Sea Animals Are Cleverer. Beasts Are Rational. On the Eating of Flesh. Translated by Harold Cherniss, W. C. Helmbold. Loeb Classical Library No. 406. Cambridge, Massachusetts: Harvard University Press, 1957.  Online version at Harvard University Press.
 Proclus, Hymn to Athena in Sallust, On the gods and the world; and the Pythagoric sentences of Demophilus, translated from the Greek; and five hymns by Proclus, in the original Greek, with a poetical version. To which are added five hymns by the translator, translated by Thomas Taylor, London, Printed for E. Jeffrey, 1793. Online version at Hathi Trust
 Rutherford, Ian, Greco-Egyptian Interactions: Literature, Translation, and Culture, 500 BC-AD 300, Oxford University Press, 2016. .
 Scheer, Eduard, Lycophronis ALexandra, Volume II Scholia continens, Weidmann, Berlin, 1908. Internet Archive
  
 Smyth, Herbert Weir, Aeschylus, with an English translation by Herbert Weir Smyth, Volume II, London Heinemann, 1926. Internet Archive
 Sommerstein, Alan H., Aeschylus: Fragments. Edited and translated by Alan H. Sommerstein. Loeb Classical Library No. 505. Cambridge, Massachusetts: Harvard University Press, 2009. . Online version at Harvard University Press.
 Spineto, Natale, "Models of the Relationship between God and Huma in 'Paganism', in The Quest for a Common Humanity: Human Dignity and Otherness in the Religious Traditions of the Mediterranean, BRILL, 2011. .
 Taylor, Thomas (1820a), The Commentaries of Proclus on the Timæus of Plato Vol 1., London: Thomas Taylor, 1820. Internet Archive
 Taylor, Thomas (1820b), The Commentaries of Proclus on the Timæus of Plato Vol 2., London: Thomas Taylor, 1820. Internet Archive
 West, M. L. (1983), The Orphic Poems, Clarendon Press. .
 West, M. L. (2003), Greek Epic Fragments: From the Seventh to the Fifth Centuries BC. Edited and translated by Martin L. West. Loeb Classical Library No. 497. Cambridge, Massachusetts: Harvard University Press, 2003.  . Online version at Harvard University Press.

Further reading

External links 

 Article for Zagreus at the Theoi Project

Cult of Dionysus
Greek gods
Infanticide
Children of Persephone
Children of Zeus
Killed deities
Dionysus in mythology
Life-death-rebirth gods
Deeds of Hera
Deeds of Athena
Deeds of Demeter
Deeds of Apollo